The Murchison blind snake (Anilios leptosoma) is a species of snake in the Typhlopidae family.

References

Anilios
Reptiles described in 1972
Snakes of Australia
Taxobox binomials not recognized by IUCN